The Sound of Gigha is a sound between the Inner Hebridean Isle of Gigha and Kintyre. It forms part of the Atlantic Ocean.

External links

Gigha
Isle of Gigha